Denys Viktorovych Syzonenko (born April 13, 1984) is a Ukrainian former swimmer, who specialized in freestyle events. He is a single-time Olympian (2004), and a two-time relay medalist at the Universiade (2003 and 2005). He also trains for Dynamo Kyiv swimming team, under his longtime coach Viktor Turchin.

Syzonenko qualified only for the men's 4 × 100 m freestyle relay, as a member of the Ukrainian team, at the 2004 Summer Olympics in Athens. Teaming with Andriy Serdinov, Pavel Khnykin, and Yuriy Yegoshin in heat two, Syzonenko swam a lead-off leg and recorded a split of 50.05, but the Ukrainians missed the top 8 final by almost a full second, finishing in fifth place and tenth overall with a national record of 3:18.95.

At the 2005 Summer Universiade in Izmir, Turkey, Syzonenko helped out the Ukrainian team (Anton Buhayov, Oleg Lisogor, and Serhiy Advena) to upset their American rivals and claim the medley relay title in a final time of 3:38.49.

References

External links
Profile – Swim Ukraine 
NBC Olympics Profile

1984 births
Living people
Ukrainian male swimmers
Olympic swimmers of Ukraine
Swimmers at the 2004 Summer Olympics
Ukrainian male freestyle swimmers
Universiade medalists in swimming
People from Bila Tserkva
Universiade gold medalists for Ukraine
Universiade silver medalists for Ukraine
Medalists at the 2003 Summer Universiade
Medalists at the 2005 Summer Universiade
Sportspeople from Kyiv Oblast
21st-century Ukrainian people